The 2011 Moçambola was the 36th season of top-tier football in Mozambique. The season began on 5 March. Liga Muçulmana were the defending champions, having won their 1st Mozambican championship in 2010. They successfully defended their title.

The league comprises 14 teams, the bottom three of which will play a relegation round.

League table

Results
Each team plays every opponent twice, once at each team's home ground.

Goalscorers

References

Moçambola
Mozambique
Mozambique
football